The Coyote Creek Trail is a pedestrian and cycling trail along Coyote Creek in San Jose, California, which continues into Coyote Valley and northern Morgan Hill. The Coyote Creek Trail was designated part of the National Recreation Trail system in 2009. It is also part of the Bay Area Ridge Trail system.

Coyote Creek Trail in San Jose 

The northern portion of the trail is in the San Jose city limits. The northernmost point is at the southern tip of San Francisco Bay.
The trail is not yet continuous within San Jose.
A paved section exists between the Highway 237 Bikeway and Tasman Drive. A short disconnected segment is at Berryessa Road at the San Jose Flea Market and Berryessa BART Station. The trail is paved from Tully Road south for 2 miles to the end of the city-maintained segment at Hellyer County Park, where the paved county section continues.

Ecological artist Deborah Kennedy was commissioned by the San Jose Public Art Program to work alongside sculptor Diana Pumpelly Bates in 2004 on completion of a community project for the Coyote Creek Trail. Their public artworks, including Kennedy's 'Ripple Effect' and Bates 'Run River Run', are used to promote public awareness of a concrete landing pad and ramp leading to a levee where strollers, wheelchairs, and bicyclists have greater accessibility to the site.

Coyote Creek Parkway 
The southern county-maintained portion of the Coyote Creek Trail is part of the Coyote Creek Parkway, which includes the trail and a chain of county parks along the creek.
The county portion is 15 miles of paved trail from Hellyer Park to Anderson Lake.

Landmarks on the trail 

 City of San Jose
 North San Jose segment
 Highway 237 Bikeway
 VTA light rail Cisco Way station
 Berryessa District segment
 San Jose Flea Market
 Berryessa BART Station
 South San Jose segment - contiguous with county portion of trail
 connects to Hellyer County Park
 Santa Clara County
 Hellyer County Park
 Hellyer Park Velodrome
 Coyote, California
 Santa Clara County Model Aircraft Skypark
 Anderson Lake County Park

Gallery

References

External links 

 "Coyote Creek Trail-San Jose Trail Network", by American Trails
 Coyote Creek Parkway North trail map by Bay Area Ridge Trail
 Coyote Creek Parkway South trail map by Bay Area Ridge Trail
 "Coyote Creek Trail", by Bay Area Mountain Bike Rides
 Coyote Creek Trail North: Yerba Buena Road to San Francisco Bay by Ronald Horii, observations in 2009
 Coyote Creek Trail South: Hellyer Park to Anderson Lake Park by Ronald Horii, observations in 2009

Bike paths in San Jose, California
Trails in the San Francisco Bay Area
Bay Area Ridge Trail
National Recreation Trails in California